Wighteone is an isoflavone, a type of flavonoid. It can be found in Maclura aurantiaca, the hedge apple.

References 

Isoflavones
Prenylflavonoids
Resorcinols